Interplay was a gaming magazine published from 1981 to 1982 by Metagaming Concepts.

Contents
Interplay was a magazine focusing on Metagaming products exclusively, particularly The Fantasy Trip.

Publication history
After Metagaming Concepts had sold off The Space Gamer, they later began publishing a new periodical: Interplay: The Metagamer Diaries #1 (May/June 1981). Per Shannon Appelcline, "Unfortunately, it wasn't up to Metagaming's previous standards. The magazine's black & white covers were a clear step down from the glossy full-color covers of The Space Gamer. Its interior also looked a lot more like the fannish magazines then being produced by Judges Guild than Interplay'''s more  distinguished predecessor." The company began having financial difficulties, and in Interplay #8 (September/October 1982), Howard Thompson highlighted Metagaming's successful series and promised the impending release of new products which never actually appeared. Thompson soon left the game industry, but before that Interplay magazine was sold to Genesis Gaming Products, who also picked up Heritage USA's Dwarfstar Games (1981–1982).

Reception
W. G. Armintrout reviewed the first issue of Interplay in The Space Gamer No. 41. Armintrout commented that "If you can't live without Metagaming designer notes and errata, then you'll have to have Interplay. For TFT'' material, it seems to me that you should buy the annual supplement instead. I found the first issue to be useful (though not well-written or well-edited)."

References

Defunct magazines published in the United States
Hobby magazines published in the United States
Magazines established in 1981
Magazines disestablished in 1982
Role-playing game magazines